Megachile cliffordi is a species of bee in the family Megachilidae. It was described by Rayment in 1953.

References

Cliffordi
Insects described in 1953